Nova Kakhovka is a city in the central Kakhovka Raion region of Kherson Oblast in southern Ukraine. Nova Kakhovka has been under Russian occupation since February 2022.

Nova Kakhovka is an important port city on the east bank of the Dnieper River, where it meets the downstream end of the Kakhovka Reservoir. It forms one abutment of the Kakhovsky Bridge over the hydroelectric dam; the other is located in Beryslav. The city lies immediately downstream of the source of the North Crimean Canal that irrigates the Crimean peninsula and can be said to control the seat of the channel. The city's population is

History
Nova Kakhovka was founded on 28 February 1952, on the site where the village of Klyucheve had existed since 1891. Situated close to the Kakhovka Hydroelectric Power Plant dam, one of the Soviet Union's Great Construction Projects of Communism, the city was built to house the plant's construction workers.

Schools 1 and 2 opened in the fall of 1950, and on October 10, the Dniprobud administration created a housing department tasked with building a new town of hydroelectric engineers. By April 20, 1951, the foundation of the first residential building, at Karl Marx, 31, had been laid, followed by the building's opening on 30 May.

In nine months, 154 km of railways were built, and on February 10, 1952, a train from Fedorivka arrived in Nova Kakhovka. At noon, a freight train originating in Chelyabinsk, Moscow, Bryansk approached the triumphal arch, where it was met by thousands of construction workers before delivering its load directly to a construction site. The railway became an important transportation artery, accelerating the construction of the hydroelectric plant, city, suburban farms, and the entire middle portion of the Kherson region. After the completion of the power plant, most of the workers stayed in Nova Kakhovka.

Originally destined to remain a small 20,000-person city of hydroelectric engineers, Nova Kakhovka possessed broad development prospects beyond a highly skilled and experienced population due to its central location in Kherson region and access to cheap electricity, railways, highways and waterways, which opened the way to large-tonnage ships from the mouth of the Dnieper to the Pripyat.

Until 18 July 2020, Nova Kakhovka was incorporated as a city of oblast significance and the center of Nova Kakhovka Municipality. The municipality as an administrative unit was abolished in July 2020 as part of the administrative reform of Ukraine, which reduced the number of raions of Kherson Oblast to five, and it was merged into the Kakhovka Raion.

Russian invasion of Ukraine 
The Russian occupation of Nova Kakhovka in Ukraine began on February 24, 2022, with explosions and shelling from the direction of temporarily occupied Crimea. Russian troops quickly took control of the city and its key infrastructure, including the hydroelectric power plant and canal. A family attempting to flee the city was shot by Russian troops on the dam of the power plant.

Over the next few months, the city was occupied by Russian forces and the population subjected to pro-Russian rallies and the reopening of a Lenin monument. Ukrainian troops responded with acts of resistance, destroying Russian military units and ammunition warehouses, though they were unable to put an end to the Russian presence in Nova Kakhovka.

On January 9, 2023, Russian occupiers ordered the closing of several area hospitals and on January 20, the city hospital was shelled. This was followed by more mortar attacks, leading to a partial loss of electricity and damage to residential buildings.

On January 23–24, 2023, Ukrainian forces conducted a raid on the left-bank of the Dnipro River near Nova Kakhovka, destroying the advanced Russian command post. The city remains under siege, though not without loss to the Ukrainian military side. Service member Yuriy Viktorovych Nizhensky died during the fighting.

Geography
 

The city is sometimes referred to as an oasis because it was built on an area where sand was plentiful. During the city's construction, sod was brought in to build its parks directly on the sandy ground. Architectural plans were developed to build streets and squares in harmony with the reservoir shoreline.

Climate

Modern Nova Kakhovka

Economy and transport
The main economic activities in Nova Kakhovka are engineering (electrotechnology) and power production. Near the city, the large North Crimean Canal begins, supplying southwest Kherson Oblast and the entire northern part of the Crimea with water from the Dnieper River.

The city is located between Kherson in the west and Melitopol to the east, near European route E58, which runs from Odesa to Rostov-on-Don. The city has a non-electrified, one-track railway, an airport, a water route to the Black Sea, and a port located on the southwest part of the Khakovka Reservoir.

Administrative divisions
Nova Kakhovka city includes both a small city and an urban type village, in addition to eight small villages in the outlying area.

Small towns and urban type villages: Tavriysk and Dnipryany
Villages and rural type settlements: Korsunka, Maslivka, Novy Laheri, Obryvky, Pischane, Plodove, Raiske and Topolivka

City attractions
Stepan Faldzinsky Park, a designated protected natural area, is named after the native Polish agrarian from Podolie who created the green oasis at the Oleshky Sands.

Views of Nova Kakhovka

Culture
 
 
The main cultural center of Nova Kakhovka is the Palace of Culture, which hosts regular performances of creative groups and folk ensembles, both local and from neighboring areas.

Nova Kakhovka has a museum of local history with a permanent exhibition on the history of the city, a wine museum, the house-museum of Anatoly Bakhuta, an art gallery named after Albin Gavdzinsky, libraries, a summer theater, and the "Youth" cinema, part of the Cinema Palace.

The city has three parks, squares, beaches, promenade, numerous cafés, nightclubs, a zoo and amusement park.

Sports
 
Nova Kakhovka has three sports schools for children and youth, 21 gyms, 110 sports grounds, a water sports base, and 13 tennis courts.

The Novokakhovska Tennis School is one of the best in Ukraine and well-known graduates include not only male (Andriy Shashkov, Maksym Dubov, Serhiy Yaroshenko, Serhiy Vergun, Oleksandr Maksymov and Dmytro Biletsky) and female players (Motobol Natalia Biletska, Yuliana Fedak and Halyna Furgailo) but also coaches (Serhiy Zhytsky, an Honored Coach of Ukraine, Serhiy Korovaiko, Andriy Dubov, Tetyana Furgailo, Olga Kushnirenko and Anatoliy Biletsky).

The Energia City Stadium hosts popular sports such as motoball and soccer. Motorcyclists won silver medals in the 2001 Ukrainian championship, and the FC Enerhiya Nova Kakhovka football team has won the regional cup 21 times and the regional championship 25 times.

Nova Kakhovka's Dynamo archery complex can simultaneously hold 70 archers on the shooting range, and the city has won the archery championships of Ukraine and the Cup of Ukraine. The city's archery team took eighth place at the 2002 championship of Ukraine. Among the city's more famous archers are Tamara Literova, Vadim Reznikov, Lyudmila Arzhannikova and Anastasia Pavlova.

Nova Kakhovka has also developed children's and youth basketball programs with the assistance of coaches like Dzyubenko N. Z., whose students have represented the city at regional competitions. The city's basketball players are part of professional teams in Kyiv, Dnipro, Cherkasy, Odesa, and Poltava.

Media of Nova Kakhovka
Five weekly newspapers are published in Nova Kakhovka: the Nova Kakhovka (founded by the city council) and the private Novyny Dilovi, Klyuchi, Dniprovsikyi Prospect and Tavriiski chas publications.

Нова Каховка.City is an online city publication created in October 2017 by the Center for the Development of Deaf Children and the Abo local media development agency.

Radio broadcasting services in the city are provided by the Novokakhovka City Radio Organization.

Notable people
Lyudmila Arzhannikova – world and European archery champion
Anatoliy Bakhuta – Ukrainian poet, laureate of the international literary prize named after Aleksei Kruchonykh
Valeriy Borzov – two-time Olympic champion in athletics
Sergei Chukhray – three-time Olympic champion in rowing
Maxim Dondyuk – Ukrainian documentary filmmaker
Snizhana Egorova – Ukrainian actress and television presenter
Stepan Faldinsky (1883-1967) – gardener, park decorator, and creator of the city park
Albin Gavdinsky – Ukrainian artist
Oleh Golyanovsky (b. 1957) – Ukrainian doctor
Constantine Gubka – Merited Master of Sports title-holder and five-time kickboxing world champion
Oleksandr Gunko – Ukrainian poet, journalist and public figure
Viktor Kislovsky – combatant with the 5th Company of the Dnipro-1 Regiment's Volunteer Battalion
Tamara Literova – Soviet archery champion
Denys Perepelytsia – Armed Forces of Ukraine soldier fighting in the Russo-Ukrainian War
Vadym Reznikov – Soviet Ukrainian archery coach
Valeriy Vakhnenko (1957-2016) – Armed Forces of Ukraine officer who fought in the Russo-Ukrainian war
Anastasia Vladislavovna – European champion who competed in the XXXI Olympic Games in Rio de Janeiro
Hennadiy Zuev (b. 1975) – Honored Coach of Ukraine, Master of Sports title-holder and Honored Worker of Physical Culture and Sports of Ukraine

Twin towns
Saint-Étienne-du-Rouvray, France

References

External links

 Official city website
 Local media NK-Online
 Unofficial city website with newest photos
 Tavria Games Festival

 
Cities in Kherson Oblast
Populated places established in the Ukrainian Soviet Socialist Republic
Populated places established in 1952
Cities of regional significance in Ukraine
Populated places on the Dnieper in Ukraine
Company towns in Ukraine
Populated places of Kakhovka Reservoir
1952 establishments in the Soviet Union
Kakhovka Raion